Augustus Frederick Dillon (1881 – 19 September 1952) was a Canadian lacrosse player who competed in the 1908 Summer Olympics. He was part of the Canadian team which won the gold medal.

References

Gus Dillon's profile at Sports Reference.com

1881 births
1952 deaths
Canadian lacrosse players
Olympic lacrosse players of Canada
Lacrosse players at the 1908 Summer Olympics
Olympic gold medalists for Canada
Medalists at the 1908 Summer Olympics
Olympic medalists in lacrosse